Tumbling Down may refer to:

"Tumbling Down" (Cockney Rebel song), 1974
"Tumbling Down" (Tessanne Chin song), 2013
"Tumblin' Down" (Blind Melon song), 2008
"Tumblin' Down" (Ziggy Marley song), 1988
 "Komm, süsser Tod", a song from the soundtrack of the film The End of Evangelion

See also
The Walls Came Tumbling Down (disambiguation)